() is the Portuguese word for cod and—in a culinary context—dried and salted cod.

Portuguese and other cuisines
 dishes are common in Portugal, and also in former Portuguese colonies such as Cape Verde, Angola, Macau, Brazil, and Goa. There are said to be over 1000 recipes for salt cod in Portugal alone and it can be considered the iconic ingredient of Portuguese cuisine. (Curiously it is one of the few species of fish not consumed fresh in this fish-loving country, which boasts the highest per capita fish consumption within the European Union). It is often cooked on social occasions and is the traditional Christmas Eve dinner in some parts of Portugal.

Similar recipes can be found across Europe. It is also found in the cuisines of other territories and regions such as the Dominican Republic, Puerto Rico, Jamaica, and Suriname. In Norway  commonly refers to a specific Spanish-style dish prepared with salted and dried cod, potatoes, onions, tomatoes, and olives which was assimilated to Norwegian cuisine in the 20th century, and is now officially spelled .

For centuries, salted, dried cod came primarily from the North Atlantic fisheries of the Grand Banks of Newfoundland  and Georges Bank, with the salting and drying done in Newfoundland and Nova Scotia, with lesser volumes caught and dried in Iceland and Norway. It was a cheap food until the collapse of the cod stocks and dismantling of Portuguese  fleet when it became more expensive, especially near Easter and Christmas time as it is a part of many traditional dishes of the holiday season.

Cuisine 
There are numerous  recipe variations, depending on region and tradition. In Portugal, it is said there are more than 365 ways to cook , one for every day of the year; others say there are 1,001 ways. Whatever the exact number,  is a ubiquitous ingredient in Portuguese cuisine.

 is often served with potatoes, sweet potatoes, yams and fresh bread. More traditional flavourings include but are not limited to garlic, onion, olive oil, black pepper, white pepper, piripiri, bay leaves, parsley, coriander and allspice. Green wine (vinho verde) or mature wines (Alentejo wine, Dão wine, or Douro wine) are served alongside.

Some  dishes:
Arroz de Bacalhau
Açorda de Bacalhau
Bacalhau à Gomes de Sá (some varieties: original, Porto)
Bacalhau à Brás
 Bacalhau Assado
Bacalhau à Zé do Pipo
Bacalhau à Lagareiro
Bacalhau com Broa
Bacalhau com Castanhas
Bacalhau com natas ( with cream)
Bacalhau com todos
Bacalhau Confitado em azeite
Bacalhau Espiritual
Bacalhau no Forno com Cebolada
Bacalhau Suado à Lisboa
Pasteis de Bacalhau/Bolinhos de Bacalhau
Pataniscas de Bacalhau

Protection in the EU and UK
The traditional production method for Bacalhau is protected in the EU and UK as a Traditional Speciality Guaranteed under the name Bacalhau de Cura Tradicional Portuguesa.

History
Salt cod has been produced for at least 500 years, since the time of the European discoveries of the New World. Before refrigeration, there was a need to preserve the cod; drying and salting are ancient techniques to preserve nutrients and the process makes the cod tastier. More importantly, fish low in oils and fats are more suitable for the drying and preservation process, as oils and fats prevent the salt from preserving the fish. Cod have very low levels of oils and fats in their muscle tissue, and most is located in the liver.

Portuguese, Norman, Breton, and English fisherman were the first to adopt the salt-based curing technique from Basque fishermen in Newfoundland near the cod-rich Grand Banks by the late 1500s. By the 1700s, salted cod had become a staple food for ordinary Portuguese people and by upper levels of Portuguese society. With the advancements in freezing and transportation in the 1900s, salted cod from North America declined and Iceland and Norway became the major supplier of the salted fish to Portuguese markets. During this time  was a cheap source of protein and frequently consumed. Thus,  became a staple of the Portuguese cuisine, nicknamed  ('loyal friend'). In fact, in Portugal, cod always refers to salted, dried codfish and it is very rare to find fresh cod for sale.

This dish is also popular in Portugal and other Roman Catholic countries because of the church. For example, the Church forbade the eating of meat on many days (Fridays, Lent, and other festivals), and so  dishes were eaten instead.   is also popular in Sfax where this dish is eaten with chermoula on the first day of Eid ul-Fitr .

In Portugal,  is often sold as a generic product with no brand information. Customers are free to touch, smell, and otherwise personally inspect the fish, which is very different from how fresh seafood is often sold. Stores can carry a large variety of  differing in color, size, smell, taste, and dryness. Such variation has led Portugal to define requirements as to what products can carry the label .

See also

 Dried and salted cod
 Fishing in Portugal
 List of dried foods
 Portuguese cuisine

Notes

References

Portuguese cuisine
Dried fish
Macanese cuisine